Godfrey Charles Joseph Isaacs (22 July 1866 – 17 April 1925) was a British businessman, and brother of the politician Rufus Isaacs, 1st Marquess of Reading.

He was born in England and educated at the Leibniz University Hannover and Free University of Brussels. He then entered his father’s firm of fruit and ship brokers. In 1910 he became Managing Director of Marconi's Wireless Telegraph Company.

He was involved in the Marconi scandal of 1912, when several British politicians were accused of "insider trading" when they acquired shares in the American subsidiary of the Marconi Company; the parent company was expected to get a contract from the British Government.

He retired from the Marconi Company in November 1924, and died in 1925 aged only 58, which the Times obituary attributed to overwork.

Family
He married Lea Constance Perelli, they had two sons, Marcel Godfrey (born 1893) and Dennys Godfrey (born 1896). 	  
Marcel Godfrey Isaacs married Marie Louise Cattier, daughter of prominent Belgian banker and philanthropist Félicien Cattier, who was also his business associate.

References
Who Was Who, 1925
"Obituary" in The Times, London of 18 April 1925 p 12. 
 :fr:Félicien Cattier
 http://archive.thetablet.co.uk/article/25th-april-1925/24/obituary

1866 births
1925 deaths
British telecommunications industry businesspeople
British Jews